Tina Ghasemi, (born 23 May 1985) is a Swedish politician for the Moderate Party and member of the Riksdagen between 2014 and 2018. Since 2021, she works as a lobbyist for the company Voi.

References 

Women members of the Riksdag
Members of the Riksdag from the Moderate Party
1985 births
Living people
21st-century Swedish women politicians